Carrie Lucas (born November 5, 1945) is an American R&B singer, born in Carmel, California. In 1976, she was signed to Soul Train Records. Lucas released six studio albums over seven years, with Soul Train and Solar Records.

Lucas was married to Soul Train Records and Solar Records founder Dick Griffey, from 1974 until his death in 2010.

Career
"I Gotta Keep Dancing" and "Gotta Get Away from Your Love" were the two hit singles from Lucas's first album, Simply Carrie, released in 1977. "I Gotta Keep Dancing" peaked at number 64 on the Billboard Hot 100 chart in 1977.

Lucas' second album, Street Corner Symphony, was released in 1978. It featured The Whispers as backing vocalists. A single from the LP, of the same name, was a homage to the 1960s doo-wop groups. The album was released on the record producer Dick Griffey's Solar Records label.

In 1979, Lucas released Carrie Lucas in Danceland. Griffey brought in Jody Watley (Shalamar) for background vocals, Lakeside (co-producers and backgrounds) and Walter and Wallace Scott (The Whispers) for backgrounds. Organist Kossi Gardner (1941–2009) wrote and played on the hit "Dance with You", which propelled the album to number 37 in the U.S Dance Album chart. "Dance with You" gave Lucas her only appearance in the UK Singles Chart, where it peaked at number 40. 1980's Portrait of Carrie was less commercially successful, although it did spawn three modest hit singles. The first 12-inch was a reworking of her first hit, re-titled as "Keep Smilin'". This was followed by "It's Not What You Got (It's How You Use It)" and "Career Girl." Griffey shared production duties with Leon Sylvers and Gardner.

Lucas' next release, Still in Love, was released in 1982. It was recorded and released under the banner of Solar Records and distributed by Elektra/Asylum. The album produced two 12-inch singles, "Men" and the more successful "Show Me Where You're Coming From." Sheila E. co-wrote the album's title track.

Her most recent album was released in 1985. Horsin' Around spawned four 12-inch singles; "Charlie," "Horsin' Around," "Summer in the Street" and "Hello Stranger." Her cover version of Barbara Lewis' "Hello Stranger" reached number 20 on the US Billboard R&B chart.

Lucas' last known recording was an appearance on the 1990 soundtrack for Lambada: Set the Night on Fire. She performed the song "I Like the Rhythm". Lucas decided to retire from the music industry, to concentrate on married life and her horses. Carrie Lucas is the mother of Carolyn Griffey of Shalamar and Lucas Griffey.

Unidisc Records in Canada released a Greatest Hits package, which contains most of her 12-inch mixes in 1999. Carrie Lucas released her first single since 1990 on May 15, 2018. The single is "Some Things Never Change", written by Carrie Lucas and Nigel Lowis made it to number 32 of Amazon's Hot New Releases of the week. The single was released on Solar Records UK. Carrie Lucas, Carolyn Griffey, Lucas Griffey and Chinese music promoter Jessie Tsang relaunched the Solar Records and Soul Train Records in the UK. The relaunch was covered in the UK magazine Soul Survivors. Jessie Tsang serves as CEO with Sonia Damney as Vice President. Carrie Lucas also owns trade mark rights to Shalamar in the UK and Europe. In 2022 Carrie Lucas participated with US cable channel TV One for a special episode of the Unsung TV series on Dick Griffey and Solar Records. The episode aired on November 6 2022.

Discography

Studio albums

Singles

References

External links
 Carrie Lucas at AllMusic.
 

1945 births
Living people
American women singers
20th-century African-American women singers
American disco musicians
People from Carmel-by-the-Sea, California
Singers from California
SOLAR Records artists
21st-century African-American people
21st-century African-American women